Doireann is an Irish feminine given name.

People named Doireann
 Doireann Garrihy, Irish social media influencer
 Doireann MacDermott, Irish academic
 Doireann Ní Bhriain, Irish radio producer
 Doireann Ní Ghríofa, Irish poet
 Doireann O’Mahony, Irish barrister

See also
List of Irish-language given names

Irish feminine given names
Irish-language feminine given names